It Began on the Clyde is a 1946 British short film directed by Ken Annakin and starring Molly Weir.

References

External links

1946 films
1946 short films
British short films
Films directed by Ken Annakin
British black-and-white films
1940s English-language films